The Akshaya project, first started in the rural areas of Malappuram district of Kerala, India, and now spread all around the state, was the first district-wide e-literacy project in India and one of the largest known Internet Protocol (IP) based wireless networks in the world. In November 2002, the state government of Kerala put into place a project, piloted in Malappuram, with the goal of at least one person in every family to be computer literate in that district. Malappuram is now what is said to be India's First E-literate District. The mission continues to make Kerala the First E-literate state in India.

External links 
 Official website of Akshaya Project
 Find nearest Akshaya Centre

Government of Kerala
E-government in India
Education in Kerala
Educational technology non-profits